Sowe is a Gambian surname. Notable people with the surname include:

Ali Sowe (born 1994), Gambian football forward
Modou Sowe (born 1963), Gambian football referee 
Mousa Balla Sowe (born 1997), Gambian football winger

Surnames of African origin